Milano San Cristoforo is a railway station in Milan, Italy. It is located at Piazza Tirana.

Services
The station is served by line S9 of the Milan suburban railway service, and by regional trains from Milan to Mortara. All these trains are operated by Trenord.

See also
Railway stations in Milan
Milan suburban railway service
Milan Metro Line 4

References

External links

San Cristoforo
Milan S Lines stations
Railway stations opened in 1915
1915 establishments in Italy
Railway stations in Italy opened in the 20th century